Niall O'Connor (born 1960) is an Irish former Gaelic footballer. At club level he played with Knocknagree, divisional side Duhallow and at inter-county level with the Cork senior football team.

Career
O'Connor's first Gaelic football successes came as a schoolboy at Rathmore Vocational School. During his time there he won an All-Ireland schools' title in 1978, while he was also a member of the Kerry inter-county vocational schools' team that won consecutive All-Ireland titles. O'Connor also joined the Knocknagree adult club team around this time and won the first of nine Duhallow JAFC titles in 1978. He also won Cork JAFC titles in 1984 and 1991. O'Connor's performances at club level saw him join the Duhallow divisional team and he won consecutive Cork SFC titles in 1990 and 1991.

O'Connor first appeared on the inter-county scene with Cork as full-forward on the under-21 team that won consecutive All-Ireland U21FC titles in 1980 and 1981. These successes saw him drafted onto the senior team and he was a member of the panel when Cork were beaten by Kerry in the 1982 Munster final.  O'Connor later linked up with the junior team and won All-Ireland JFC titles in 1984 and 1989, while also serving as team captain.

Honours
Rathmore Vocational School
All-Ireland Vocational Schools Football Championship: 1978

Kerry Vocational Schools
All-Ireland Vocational Schools Football Championship: 1977, 1978

Knocknagree
Cork Junior A Football Championship: 1984, 1991
Duhallow Junior A Football Championship: 1978, 1979, 1981, 1982, 1983, 1984, 1989, 1990, 1991

Duhallow
Cork Senior Football Championship: 1990, 1991

Cork
All-Ireland Junior Football Championship: 1984, 1989
Munster Junior Football Championship: 1984, 1989, 1992
All-Ireland Under-21 Football Championship: 1980, 1981
Munster Under-21 Football Championship: 1980, 1981

References

1960 births
Living people
Cork inter-county Gaelic footballers
Duhallow Gaelic footballers
Knocknagree Gaelic footballers